Frank Greene may refer to:

 Frank L. Greene (1870–1930), United States representative and senator from Vermont
 Frank David Greene (born 1963), American trumpet player author, and speaker
 Frank S. Greene, American scientist and venture capitalist
 Frank Greene (singer) (born 1879), English baritone in Australia

See also
 Francis Vinton Greene (1850–1921), United States Army general
 Frank Green (disambiguation)